Porterville is an unincorporated community in Bourbon County, Kansas, United States.

History
Porterville had a post office from 1882 until 1905. L. G. Porter, the first postmaster, gave the community its name.

References

Further reading

External links
 Bourbon County maps: Current, Historic - KDOT

Unincorporated communities in Bourbon County, Kansas
Unincorporated communities in Kansas